Jason Daði Svanþórsson (born 31 December 1999) is an Icelandic footballer who plays as an attacking midfielder for Icelandic club Breiðablik and the Iceland national team.

Club career
He joined Breiðablik after the 2020 season.

International career
Jason made his international debut for Iceland on 9 June 2022 in a friendly match against San Marino.

References

External links
 

1999 births
Living people
Jason Dadi Svanthorsson
Jason Dadi Svanthorsson
Association football midfielders
Jason Dadi Svanthorsson
Jason Dadi Svanthorsson